The Perth Seawater Desalination Plant, located in Naval Base, south of Perth, Western Australia, turns seawater from Cockburn Sound into nearly 140 megalitres of drinking water per day, supplying the Perth metropolitan area.

The salt water reverse-osmosis (SWRO) plant was the first of its kind in Australia, and became operational in 2006. It covers several acres in an industrial park near the suburb of Kwinana Beach.  Electricity for the plant is generated by the 80 MW Emu Downs Wind Farm located in the state's Midwest region near Cervantes. The wind farm contributes 270 GWh/year into the general power grid, more than offsetting the 180 GWh/year requirement from the desalination plant.

The desalination plant, with 12 SWRO trains with a capacity of 160 megalitres per day and six  BWRO (brackish water) trains delivering a final product of 144 megalitres per day, was expected to have one of the world’s lowest specific energy consumptions, due in part to the use of pressure exchanger energy recovery devices supplied by Energy Recovery Inc. The devices are isobaric chamber types which recover energy in the brine stream and deliver it to water going to the membrane feed at a net transfer efficiency at up to 98%.

As a condition of its continued operation, the Perth plant has a comprehensive environmental monitoring program, measuring the seawater intake and brine outfall.

Excess water from the plant is stored in the hills dams. 

In early 2008, the plant was shut down on two occasions due to reduced dissolved oxygen levels in Cockburn Sound.

See also

List of desalination plants in Australia
Reverse osmosis plant
Seawater desalination in Australia

References

External links
More on the Perth Seawater Desalination Plant

Science and technology in Western Australia
Desalination plants in Australia
Water supply and sanitation in Western Australia
Buildings and structures in Perth, Western Australia
City of Kwinana